Malcolm Grainger (born August 11, 1975) is a former Zimbabwean cricketer. He was a right-handed batsman and a right-arm medium-fast bowler who played for Matabeleland. He was born in Gwelo (now Gweru).

Grainger made an appearance for Matabeleland Schools against Ireland in 1991.

Grainger's first and only first-class appearance came in the 1994/95 Logan Cup competition, against Mashonaland Under-24s. Batting in the tailend, he scored 19 runs in the first innings and six in the second.

Grainger took figures of 5-35 with the ball, but did not play another first-class match.

External links
Malcolm Grainger at CricketArchive 

1975 births
Living people
Sportspeople from Gweru
Zimbabwean cricketers
Matabeleland cricketers